Sopa de guandú con carne salada (Pigeon pea soup with salty meat) is a Colombian cuisine dish. Along Colombia's Caribbean coast, pigeon peas are grown for canning and consumption. In the Atlantico department of Colombia the sopa de guandú con carne salada (or simply "guandules") is made.

Colombian cuisine